The Battle of Hohenfriedberg  or Hohenfriedeberg, now Dobromierz, also known as the Battle of Striegau, now Strzegom, was one of Frederick the Great's most admired victories. Frederick's Prussian army decisively defeated an Austrian army under Prince Charles Alexander of Lorraine on 4 June 1745 during the Second Silesian War (part of the War of the Austrian Succession).

Background 
Austria sought to regain Silesia, which had been lost to Prussia in the Battle of Mollwitz. An Austrian army of about 62,500, including allied Saxon troops, marched to Silesia. The commander was Prince Charles Alexander of Lorraine, brother-in-law of Empress Maria Theresa. Johann Adolf II, Duke of Saxe-Weissenfels commanded the Saxons.

Frederick had a very low opinion of his counterpart, saying of Prince Charles Alexander that "there will be some stupid mistakes." In fact, Frederick was counting on Charles entering Silesia by crossing the Giant Mountains. If he did, Frederick intended to attack the Austrian army and crush it in one decisive blow. Hans Joachim von Zieten's Zieten-Hussars shadowed the Austrian army, keeping Frederick informed of their movements and position as he awaited the right moment to strike. When the Prince finally did cross in early June, Frederick saw his opportunity to attack.

They encamped near Striegau, with the Saxons just northwest of the town at Pilgrimshain and the Austrians spreading out west and south to the village of Hohenfriedberg. Their front was covered by the Striegau River, which ran north and then west through Striegau town. The Prussian army was camped south of the town.

Prussian scouts located the Austro-Saxon forces. Frederick decided to march north with his whole force, right in front of the Austrians, cross the Striegau by a bridge just west of town, and attack the Saxons first. With the Saxons routed, Frederick would then roll up the Austrian line from east to west. He also decided to march by night, concealing his movement, and thus surprise the Saxons. One of Frederick's generals, Peter Ludwig de Moulin led the march.

To achieve surprise, Frederick ordered his troops to leave their campfires burning and tents pitched, and forbade them to talk or smoke during the march.

Battle 

Frederick's plan soon encountered difficulties. There was not enough space for all of the Prussian troops on the designated route. A bottleneck soon developed at the bridge over the Striegau, so only limited forces were able to make it over.

The first Prussian objective was two hills in front of the Saxon lines. The Saxon army had occupied these two hills the previous day with a small force. The Prussian vanguard encountered this force; the resulting clash alerted the Saxons and prevented the complete surprise Frederick hoped for.

De Moulin decided to bypass the hills and strike right at the Saxon camp before the Saxons could deploy. The Prussian attack began at about 7:00 AM.

Some Saxon cavalry got out on the field, but the Prussian cavalry soon charged and routed them. The Prussian infantry then stormed the Saxon camp, defeating the few Saxon infantry that managed to deploy, and also a few Austrian troops. The easterly wind, blowing smoke and dust into the Saxons' faces, was also advantageous for the Prussians. The entire left (Saxon) half of the Austro-Saxon army was destroyed in the hours of the dawn's light.

By then the Austrians were alerted to the battle. From their camps further to the south and more protected by the river, Austrian troops moved to the front. The Prussians who had still not crossed the Striegau to the north wheeled to the west and advanced through river crossings wherever they could find them, finding enough fords to accomplish this.  A bridge collapse at the small town of Graben forced the cavalry commander, Hans Joachim von Zieten, to find a ford further south through which to funnel cavalry and pack mules carrying supplies.

The Austrian cavalry were the first Austrian troops to get into action, but they were broken and driven off by the charge of the Prussian cavalry.

The Austrian infantry formed two lines of battle facing east, from Hohenfriedberg north. Though the Prussians now had the advantage of numbers, the Austrians resisted stubbornly, with many volleys exchanged at close range.

At this point the Prussian Bayreuth Dragoons, an oversize unit numbering around 1,500 men, entered the battle. A strong gust of wind blew away the powder smoke and the dust and revealed an opening in the Austrian lines through which to charge the vulnerable Austrian infantry. The dragoons deployed into line, and attacked north against the right flank of the first Austrian line. They drove all the way along that line, routing it completely, then turned south to destroy the second Austrian line.

The Austrians, already outnumbered, abandoned by their Saxon allies, without cavalry protection, and now broken by this attack, began to surrender en masse. The Bayreuth Dragoons defeated several thousand Austrian infantry and only suffered 94 casualties. The Dragoons overran twenty battalions, took 2,500 prisoners, capturing 67 flags and standards as well as four cannons in what is considered and celebrated as one of the great cavalry battlefield triumphs. The battle ended with the complete defeat of the Austro-Saxon army.

The Austrians and Saxons lost almost 9,000 killed and wounded, about 5,000 prisoners, including four generals, and 66 guns. The Prussians lost around 5,000.

Aftermath 
Hohenfriedberg was a great victory for Frederick, and soon, he was being called "Frederick the Great" by his contemporaries. The charge of the Bayreuth Dragoons was studied by later Prussian and German officers as a model for aggressiveness, and the entire spirit of aggressiveness that Frederick had instilled in his army and the large amount of autonomy given to his officers were likened to the tradition of Mission-type tactics. A delighted Fredrick wrote that "there has not been so decisive a defeat since Blenheim".

Charles of Lorraine was defeated again just as at the Battle of Chotusitz, which showed that the Prussians could crush a numerically-equal enemy. The Second Silesian War, which was the last part of the War of the Austrian Succession in which Prussia took part, was almost at an end despite a close call at the Battle of Soor against the Austrians, who were again led by Charles of Lorraine, the peace at Dresden was signed on 25 December 1745, soon after yet another Prussian victory at the Battle of Kesselsdorf against the Saxons.

The Der Hohenfriedberger was a march composed in honor of the victory, allegedly by Frederick himself.

See also 
Hohenfriedberger Marsch
Wars and battles involving Prussia

Notes

References 
Chandler, David: The Art of Warfare in the Age of Marlborough. Spellmount Limited, (1990). 
Citino, Robert M.: The German Way of War: From the Thirty Years War to the Third Reich. University Press of Kansas, (2005).

External links 

wargame about the battle

Hohenfriedberg
Hohenfriedberg 1745
Hohenfriedberg 1745
Hohenfriedberg 1745
Hohenfriedberg 1745
1745 in Austria
Hohenfriedberg 1745
Hohenfriedberg 1745
History of Lower Silesian Voivodeship